Slađan Đukić (also transliterated Sladjan Djukić; born 21 December 1966) is a Serbian former professional footballer who played as a midfielder. He spent his late career in France.

He last played in Division Honneur for Saint-André-les-Vergers.

Honours
Troyes
UEFA Intertoto Cup: 2001

References

External links
 
 
 
 

1966 births
Living people
Yugoslav footballers
Serbian footballers
Association football midfielders
OFK Kikinda players
FK Zemun players
FK Partizan players
Stade Brestois 29 players
FC Lorient players
ES Troyes AC players
Nîmes Olympique players
Ligue 1 players
Ligue 2 players
Serbian expatriate footballers
Serbian expatriate sportspeople in France
Expatriate footballers in France